Anbura is a Syrian village located in the Masyaf Subdistrict in Masyaf District, located west of Hama. According to the Syria Central Bureau of Statistics (CBS), Anbura had a population of 998 in the 2004 census. Its inhabitants are predominantly Alawites.

References

Bibliography

Alawite communities in Syria
Populated places in Masyaf District